The Europe/Africa Zone was one of the three zones of the regional Davis Cup competition in 1991.

In the Europe/Africa Zone there were two different tiers, called groups, in which teams competed against each other to advance to the upper tier. Winners in Group I advanced to the World Group Qualifying Round, along with losing teams from the World Group first round. Teams who lost in the first round competed in the relegation play-offs, with winning teams remaining in Group I, whereas teams who lost their play-offs were relegated to the Europe/Africa Zone Group IIs in 1992.

Participating nations

Draw

  and  relegated to Group II in 1992.

First round

Portugal vs. Ireland

Poland vs. Romania

Denmark vs. Morocco

Hungary vs. Soviet Union

Second round

Portugal vs. Netherlands

Poland vs. Great Britain

Finland vs. Denmark

Switzerland vs. Soviet Union

Relegation play-offs

Romania vs. Ireland

Hungary vs. Morocco

References

External links
Davis Cup official website

Davis Cup Europe/Africa Zone
Europe Africa Zone Group I